early-music.com is a Canadian record label, based in Montreal. It is dedicated to the promotion of Early Music performance on period instruments.

History 
early-music.com was founded in 2002 in Montreal by Claire Guimond. The company has about 25 titles in its catalogue, 11 of which are with the Arion Baroque Orchestra.

The label's motto is "world class early music on period instruments". It explores the European repertoire of the 17th and 18th centuries.

Its catalogue is distributed internationally by Naxos.

Artists 
 Alison Melville, Baroque Flute
 Arion Baroque Orchestra
 Claire Guimond, Baroque Flute
 Gary Cooper, Harpsichord
 Hank Knox, Harpsichord
 Jaap ter Linden, Cello
 Johanne Couture, Harpsichord
 Luc Beauséjour, Harpsichord
 Mathieu Lussier, Bassoon
 Matthew Wadsworth, Lute
 Monica Huggett, Violin
 Timothy Roberts, Keyboards

External links 
early-music.com Official website

References

early music record labels